Perkinsiella is a genus of delphacid planthoppers in the family Delphacidae. There are more than 30 described species in Perkinsiella.

Species
These 35 species belong to the genus Perkinsiella:

 Perkinsiella amboinensis Muir, 1911
 Perkinsiella bakeri Muir, 1916
 Perkinsiella bicoloris Muir, 1911
 Perkinsiella bigemina Ding, 1980
 Perkinsiella boreon Fennah, 1979
 Perkinsiella bulli Fennah, 1979
 Perkinsiella diagoras Fennah, 1979
 Perkinsiella dorsata (Melichar, 1905)
 Perkinsiella facialis (Distant, 1912)
 Perkinsiella falcipennis Fennah, 1979
 Perkinsiella fuscipennis Muir, 1916
 Perkinsiella graminicida Kirkaldy, 1906
 Perkinsiella insignis (Distant, 1912)
 Perkinsiella lalokensis Muir, 1911
 Perkinsiella lineata Muir, 1916
 Perkinsiella macrinus Fennah, 1979
 Perkinsiella manilae Muir, 1917
 Perkinsiella miriamae Emeljanov, 1987
 Perkinsiella mycon Fennah, 1979
 Perkinsiella neoinsignis Muir, 1923
 Perkinsiella pallidula Muir, 1911
 Perkinsiella papuensis Muir, 1911
 Perkinsiella pseudosinensis Muir, 1916
 Perkinsiella rattlei Muir, 1911
 Perkinsiella rivularis Linnavuori, 1964
 Perkinsiella saccharicida Kirkaldy, 1903 (sugarcane planthopper)
 Perkinsiella saccharivora Muir, 1916
 Perkinsiella sinensis Kirkaldy, 1907
 Perkinsiella thompsoni Muir, 1913
 Perkinsiella variegata Muir, 1911
 Perkinsiella vastatrix (Breddin, 1896)
 Perkinsiella vitalisi Muir, 1925
 Perkinsiella vitiensis Kirkaldy, 1906
 Perkinsiella yakushimensis Ishihara, 1954
 Perkinsiella yuanjiangensis Ding, 1985

References

Further reading

 
 
 
 

Delphacini
Auchenorrhyncha genera
Articles created by Qbugbot